National Academy for Planning and Development (NAPD) is a Government of Bangladesh Ministry of Planning not-for-profit training and research institution that specializes in post-graduate education in related to public management and development. The Academy started in 3 February in 1985. It was made a statutory organization in 2014.

References

Educational institutions established in 1985
Business schools in Bangladesh
1985 establishments in Bangladesh
Universities and colleges in Dhaka